Panagaeus robustus is a species of ground beetle in the Panagaeinae subfamily that can be found in Japan and Maritime province of Russia. In Japan, the species was found in Ezo, Junsai, Sapporo, and Shiraoi provinces.

References

External links
Images of Panagaeus robustus on Zin

Beetles described in 1862
Beetles of Asia